Minaxür is a village and the least populous municipality in the Qusar Rayon of Azerbaijan. It has a population of 242.

References

Populated places in Qusar District